The 1972 National Indoor Championships, also known as the Hampton Indoor, was a men's tennis tournament played on indoor carpet courts at the Hampton Roads Coliseum in Hampton, Virginia in the United States that was part of Group C of the 1972 Grand Prix circuit as well as of the 1972 USLTA Indoor Circuit. It was the third edition of the tournament and was held  from February 28 through March 5, 1972. First-seeded Stan Smith won the singles title and earned $9,000 first-prize money.

Finals

Singles

 Stan Smith defeated  Ilie Năstase 6–3, 6–2, 6–7(3–5), 6–4
 It was Smith' 3rd singles title of the year and the 39th of his career.

Doubles

 Ilie Năstase /  Ion Ţiriac defeated  Andrés Gimeno /  Manuel Orantes 7–5, 7–5

See also
 1972 U.S. National Indoor Tennis Championships
 1972 U.S. Professional Indoor

References

External links
 ITF tournament edition details

National Indoor Championships
National Indoor Championships
National Indoor Championships
1972 in sports in Virginia